Depredation may refer to:

 military raiding, particularly for the purposes of pillage;
 damage to agriculture attributed to pests;
 robbery, especially grave or tomb robbing.